David W. Floyd (born October 2, 1951, in Louisville, Kentucky) is an American politician and a former Republican member of the Kentucky House of Representatives for District 50. Floyd dropped out after filing for re-election in 2016 when Republican Chad McCoy challenged Floyd in the primary.  Floyd was later appointed to be KY House Chief of Staff in 2018, after which controversy arose over his campaign contributions to his new boss Speaker David Osborne who appointed him.  Floyd was known for pushing to abolish the Death Penalty in Kentucky even though his home district of Nelson County and the state overwhelmingly supports the Death Penalty in capital murder cases. 

Floyd earned his BS from the United States Air Force Academy, and his MA in aeronautics from Embry–Riddle Aeronautical University.

Elections
2012 Floyd was challenged in the May 22, 2012 Republican Primary, winning with 894 votes (72.6%) and won the November 6, 2012 General election with 11,379 votes (53.4%) against Democratic nominee Dick Heaton.
1996 Floyd initially ran for the District 50 seat and won the 1996 Republican Primary but lost the November 5, 1996 General election to Democratic nominee Jodie Haydon.
1998 Floyd and Representative Haydon were both unopposed for their 1998 primaries, setting up a rematch; Floyd lost the November 3, 1998 General election to Representative Haydon.
2004 When Representative Haydon left the Legislature and left the seat open, Floyd won the 2004 Republican Primary with 569 votes (72.0%) and won the November 2, 2004 General election with 9,952 votes (54.0%) against Democratic nominee Tommy Reed.
2006 Floyd was unopposed for both the 2006 Republican Primary and the November 7, 2006 General election, winning with 7,880 votes.
2008 Floyd was unopposed for both the 2008 Republican Primary and the November 4, 2008 General election, winning with 14,623 votes.
2010 Floyd was unopposed for the May 18, 2010 Republican Primary and won the November 2, 2010 General election with 10,325 votes (63.4%) against Democratic nominee Eddie O'Daniel.

References

External links
Official page at the Kentucky General Assembly
Campaign site

David Floyd at Ballotpedia
David Floyd at OpenSecrets

1951 births
Living people
Embry–Riddle Aeronautical University alumni
Republican Party members of the Kentucky House of Representatives
People from Bardstown, Kentucky
Politicians from Louisville, Kentucky
United States Air Force Academy alumni
United States Air Force officers
21st-century American politicians